Kalimantsi (also spelled Kalimantzi or Kalimanci, or ) is a village in southwestern Bulgaria. It is located in the municipality of Sandanski in the Blagoevgrad Province.

Villages in Blagoevgrad Province